Fordsons may refer to:
Fordson, a type of Ford tractor mostly made in Ireland but also in Detroit (Ford & Son)
Ford of Britain, lorries, trucks and small trucks and vans made at Dagenham England
Fordsons F.C., a defunct Irish soccer team from the tractor-making business